Mmadikola is a village in the Central District of Botswana. It is located in the western part of the district, close to Makgadikgadi Pan, and it has a primary school. The population was 828 in 2001 census.

Mmadikola is a small rural village. It has a population of around 5000, mixed with Bayei (who make large part of the population), Bakalanga, Bananjwa and Banoka.

The reasons for the small population may be that people migrated from the village because there are no industries set up, no minerals to extract, and poor soils for both pastoral and arable farming.

Somewhere in the 1900s due to divide and rule, the Yeyi people were moved from areas around Maun to the central district. According to the elders, the few Yei people that were migrated from the Ngami region pleaded with the authorities at the time to at least leave them at Mmadikola, the reason being they are people of the water as their name carries that meaning. At the time a large area of Mmadikola was covered with water and rivers were overflowing. They were left there.

Today most Mmadikola residents migrate to the nearby big villages like Letlhakane and Orapa where the diamond mines are to find jobs.

On 9February 2016, Thembani Moitlhobogi from Mmadikola, won the competition of naming the second-largest gem-quality diamond ever found. He named the stone Lesedi La Rona which means "Our Light". He stated that his reason for the name was that "the diamond is a pride, light and hope of Batswana". During the competition Lucara Diamond Corporation received 11,000 emails and 1,000 SMSs with name suggestions. In addition to naming the diamond, Moitlhobogi also received P25,000 (about $2,170).

References 

Populated places in Central District (Botswana)
Villages in Botswana